

World Cup

World Championships

^ Charlotte Bankes started representing France in season 2010/11. She began competing in World Cups for France from 2013/14 and also competed at the 2015 and 2017 World Championships. Records here are achievements since transferring to a British licence in November 2018. Her first season racing for Great Britain in World Cups and other competitions was 2018/19 and her first World Championships for Great Britain were in 2019.

^^ Gus Kenworthy competed for USA until 2019/20 when he switched to Great Britain. While competing for USA, Gus earned seven World Cup podiums (including two victories), one Olympic silver medal and one World Championships silver medal.

References

Skiing in the United Kingdom
Lists of sports medalists